Moschiola meminna is a species of even-toed ungulate in the chevrotain family (Tragulidae). Particularly in the old literature, M. meminna often refers to the spotted chevrotains as a whole. Today, the name is increasingly restricted to the Sri Lankan spotted chevrotain or white-spotted chevrotain, with the Indian spotted chevrotain M. indica and/or the yellow-striped chevrotain M.  kathygre treated as distinct species. 

In Sri Lanka, this species is found in the dry zone and is replaced in the wet zone by the yellow-striped chevrotain.

Description
Head and body length in the species typically is  55–60 cm. It is dull brown in color with three or four dotted white stripes going longitudinally along flank.

References

External links
 America Zoo
 

Chevrotains
Mammals of Sri Lanka
Mammals described in 1777